Northmead is a suburb of Greater Western Sydney, in the state of New South Wales, Australia. Northmead is located 26 kilometres west of the Sydney central business district, in the local government area of the City of Parramatta.

Northmead is a hilly suburb with low to medium density houses, townhouses and apartment buildings, and a large light industrial area. It is located to the northeast of the junction of Darling Mills Creek and Toongabbie Creek, which combine to form the beginnings of the Parramatta River.

History
With the British colonization of Parramatta, this area was originally part of the domain of Government House. What is left of this domain, including Government House, forms Parramatta Park. The name Northmead is derived from the location of the north "mead", or meadow, of the governor's domain. The land was subdivided between 1859 and 1889 and the Northern Meadow and Western Meadow of the domain were split off and called Northmead and Westmead. From this time, orchards were established by many new settlers, including some whose names were well known in the Parramatta area - George Oakes, Nat Payten and William Fullagar among them.

Heritage listings 
Northmead has a number of heritage-listed sites, including:
 64 Windsor Road: 1850 sandstone house, originally used as the manager's residence of a grain mill.
 226 (rear) Windsor Road: Northmead European rock carvings

Commercial areas
Commercial Area 1: Northmead Shopping Centre is located at 2 Campbell Street, corner of Windsor Road, and features an IGA supermarket and many specialty shops. Specialty shops include Thai take away restaurant, medical centre, florist, deli, butcher, bakery, chemist, news agency, real estate broker, fruit & veg and Italian restaurant. The centre is managed by PRD Nationwide in Bondi Junction.
Commercial Area 2: The Junction shops are located on the corner of Windsor Road and Briens Road and features a number of retailers for home furnishings, hardware, car accessories (Supercheap Auto, Repco), office supplies and electricals Officeworks, pet shop, Winning Appliances and food outlets Subway, Hungry Jack's and XS Espresso. 
Commercial Area 3: Corner of Kleins Street and Briens Road. Featuring a bottle market, a bakery, Domino's Pizza , a dental practice and a mini convenience shop.

Industrial area
The southern portion of Northmead, between Old Windsor Road and Toongabbie Creek is the home of a large number of light industries. Coca-Cola Amatil and a NSW Health Ambulance Superstation are located on Briens Road, with a Hillsbus depot on nearby Boundary Road.

Schools
 Northmead Public School - Moxhams Road.
 Northmead High School - Campbell Street.
 The Hills School - William Street.

Transport
The North West T-Way connecting the Hills with Parramatta runs through Northmead.
Northmead's public transport needs are only catered by buses, namely those of the Hillsbus bus company, Northmead being one of the suburbs to have a Hillsbus depot. This results in highly operational bus services in the Hills District - an area that is one of the fastest growing in Australia.

The major roads are Windsor Road and the Cumberland Highway.

Transport history

Northmead once featured a train line known as the Rogans Hill railway line. Long underperforming due to an increasing preference for faster and more modern motor buses, it was decided in 1929 under conservative (United Australia Party) Premier Bertram Stevens that the line should be decommissioned, which eventually took place on 31 January 1932.

Currently, there is no train line that services Northmead with the closest being the Main Western Railway Line that runs through Westmead and Parramatta.

Population
According to the  conducted by the Australian Bureau of Statistics, Northmead had a population of 11,215. This was a significant increase from the 2006 census, which showed a population of 6,969. This increase went hand in hand with an increase in apartments in the suburb from 9.9% to 32.4% over the period.

61.1% of people were born in Australia. The most common countries of birth were India 4.7%, China 3.4%, England 2.1%, Iran 2.1% and Philippines 1.9%. 63.1% of people only spoke English at home. Other languages spoken at home included Mandarin 3.4%, Arabic 2.8%, Cantonese 2.5%, Persian 2.2% and Korean 2.1%. The religious affiliation responses were Catholic (27.5%), No Religion 20.6% and Anglican (13.6%).

Notable residents
 Parramatta City Councillor, Former Lord Mayor Scott Lloyd was raised in Northmead, and went to Northmead primary school between 1983 and 1989.
 Richie Benaud (1930–2015), cricketer and commentator.
 Allan Cunningham (1791–1839), explorer and botanist.
 Harry Hopman (1906–1985), tennis player.
 David Lennox (1788–1873), colonial bridge builder.
 John Lewin (1770–1819), first professional artist in New South Wales.
 Rev. Samuel Marsden (1765–1838), known as the "flogging parson".
 Mary Cover Hassall (1799–1825), Methodist missionary to Tonga Island.
 Dowell Philip O'Reilly (1865–1923), poet and politician.
Greg Page (born 1972), Australian musician and Wiggles member.

References

Suburbs of Sydney
The Hills Shire
City of Parramatta